Charles Howard, 2nd Earl of Nottingham (17 September 1579 – 3 October 1642) of Effingham, Surrey was the second (but eldest surviving) son of Charles Howard, 1st Earl of Nottingham. His mother was the former Catherine Carey. From 1615 to 1624 he was styled Lord Howard of Effingham before he succeeding his father in the latter year as 2nd Earl of Nottingham.

He was a Member of Parliament five times between 1597 and 1614, for Bletchingley and for Surrey in 1597, for Sussex in 1601 and 1604 and for New Shoreham in the Addled Parliament of 1614. He was knighted in 1603 and later appointed Vice-Admiral of Sussex for life.

He was married first on 19 May 1597 to Charity White (d. 18 December 1618), daughter to Robert White and secondly, on 22 April 1620, to Mary Cokayne, daughter of Sir William Cockayne, Lord Mayor of London in 1619. There were no known children from either marriage and he was therefore succeeded by his half-brother, Charles Howard, 3rd Earl of Nottingham.

The senior school in Effingham, Surrey, the Howard of Effingham School, is named after him.

References

1579 births
1642 deaths
English MPs 1597–1598
English MPs 1601
English MPs 1604–1611
English MPs 1614
62
Lord-Lieutenants of Surrey
Charles Howard, 02nd Earl of Nottingham
Charles
16th-century English nobility
17th-century English nobility
Barons Howard of Effingham